Medical Image Understanding and Analysis  (MIUA) is a UK-based meeting for the communication of research related to image analysis and its application to medical imaging and biomedicine. The meetings provide an opportunity to present and discuss research in medical image understanding and analysis; a rapidly growing subject with ever increasing real-world applicability.

MIUA is collaborated with the BMVA. Medical Image understanding is an intrinsically interdisciplinary activity, drawing on expertise from computer science, engineering, physics, clinical practice and fundamental bioscience. Many researchers with an interest in MIUA topics will also belong to wider communities in each of these disciplines, which overlap, but are not congruent with, the MIUA community. See more information

The list of MIUA steering committee members 

Ke Chen, University of Liverpool.

Víctor González-Castro, University of León.

Tryphon Lambrou, University of Lincoln.

Sasan Mahmoodi, University of Southampton.

Stephen McKenna, University of Dundee.

Mark Nixon, University of Southampton.

Alison Nobel, University of Oxford.

Nasir Rajpoot, University of Warwick.

Constantino Carlos Reyes-Aldasoro, City University London.

Maria Valdes-Hernandez, University of Edinburgh.

Xianghua Xie, Swansea University.

Xujiong Ye, University of Lincoln.

Yalin Zheng, University of Liverpool.

Reyer Zwiggelaar, Aberystwyth University.

The list of current and previous MIUA Chairs
 2021: University of Oxford 
  Bartlomiej W. Papiez, Mohammad Yaqub, Jianbo Jiao, Ana Namburete, Alison Noble
 2020: University of Oxford 
  Bartlomiej W. Papiez, Ana Namburete, Mohammad Yaqub, Alison Noble
 2019: University of Liverpool 
  Yalin Zheng, Ke Chen
 2018: University of Southampton 
  Sasan Mahmoodi, Reyer Zwiggelaar, Mark Nixon (academic)
 2017: University of Edinburgh.
  Maria del Carmen Valdés Hernández, Victor Gonzalez-Castro
 2016: University of Loughborough. 
 Alastair Gale, Yan Chen
 2015: University of Lincoln. 
 Tryphon Lambrou, Xujiong Ye
 2014: City University of London. 
 Constantino Carlos Reyes-Aldasoro, Greg Slabaugh
 2013: University of Birmingham.
 Ela Claridge
 2012: University of Swansea.
 Xianghua Xie
 2011: London (KCL).
 William Crum, Graemme Penney
 2010: University of Warwick.
 Abhir Bhalearo, Nasir Rajpoot
 2009: University of Kingston.
 Jamshid Dehmeshki, Darrel Greenhill, Andreas Hoppe
 2008: University of Dundee.
 Stephen McKenna, Jesse Hoey
 2007: University of Aberystwyth.
 Fred Labrosse, Reyer Zwiggelaar
 2006: University of Manchester.
 S.M. Astley, T.F. Cootes, J. Graham, N. Thacker.
 2005: University of Bristol.
 Majid Mirmehdi
 2004: London (IC).
 Daniel Rueckert
 2003: University of Sheffield.
 David Barbar
 2002: University of Portsmouth.
 Alex Houston, Reyer Zwiggelaar
 2001: University of Birmingham.
 Ela Claridge
 2000: University College London (UCL).
 1999: University of Oxford.
 Mike Brady
 1998: University of Leeds.
 Liz Berry, DC Hogg, KV Mardia, MA Smith
 1997: University of Oxford.
 Alison Noble

References

See also
BMVA Summer School
BMVC

Computer science conferences